Verona is an unincorporated community and census-designated place (CDP) in Boone County, Kentucky, United States. The population was 1,455 at the 2010 census.

History
It has been stated that details regarding the community's settlement and its founders are unknown.

In its earlier times, Verona was "a thriving business community surrounded by farmlands". The community had a building supply store, a blacksmith, a bank, a creamery, grocery stores, a dry goods store, saloons, tobacco shops, a barber shop, a funeral home, a jail and a post office. The community's post office was opened on March 24, 1834, and Verona was incorporated as a city in 1909. The city's incorporation later dissolved when the community's leadership became dormant. The Walton-Verona independent school district was established in 1954.

Geography
The Verona CDP occupies the southern corner of Boone County, bordered by Interstate 71 to the northwest, by the Gallatin County line to the southwest, and by the Grant County line, following Bullock Pen Creek, to the south. The original hamlet of Verona is located at the intersection of Kentucky Routes 14 and 16, but the CDP includes a larger rural area surrounding the hamlet.

Demographics

References

Census-designated places in Boone County, Kentucky
Census-designated places in Kentucky
Unincorporated communities in Kentucky
Unincorporated communities in Boone County, Kentucky